This is a list of results from the 2010 African Weightlifting Championships.

56 kg Men

62 kg Men

69 kg Men

77 kg Men

85 kg Men

94 kg Men

105 kg Men

+105 kg Men

48 kg Women

53 kg Women

58 kg Women

63 kg Women

69 kg Women

75 kg Women

+75 kg Women

References 

African Weightlifting Championships
2010 in African sport
2010 in weightlifting